Quanzhou, alternatively known as Chinchew, is a prefecture-level port city on the north bank of the Jin River, beside the Taiwan Strait in southern Fujian, China. Its built-up area is home to 6,669,711 inhabitants, encompassing the Licheng, Fengze, and Luojiang urban districts; Jinjiang, Nan'an, and Shishi cities; Hui'an County; and the Quanzhou District for Taiwanese Investment. Quanzhou was China's 12th-largest extended metropolitan area in 2010.

Quanzhou was China's major port for foreign traders, who knew it as Zaiton, during the 11th through 14th centuries. It was visited by both Marco Polo and Ibn Battuta; both travelers praised it as one of the most prosperous and glorious cities in the world. It was the naval base from which the Mongol attacks on Japan and Java were primarily launched and a cosmopolitan center with Buddhist and Hindu temples, Islamic mosques, and Christian churches, including a Catholic cathedral and Franciscan friaries. A failed revolt prompted a massacre of the city's foreign communities in 1357. Economic dislocations—including piracy and an imperial overreaction to it during the Ming and Qing—reduced its prosperity, with Japanese trade shifting to Ningbo and Zhapu and other foreign trade restricted to Guangzhou. Quanzhou became an opium-smuggling center in the 19th century but the siltation of its harbor hindered trade by larger ships.

Because of its importance for medieval maritime commerce, unique mix of religious buildings, and extensive archeological remains, the old town of Quanzhou was inscribed on the UNESCO World Heritage List in 2021.

Names
Quanzhou (also known as Zayton or Zaiton in British and American historical sources) is the atonal pinyin romanization of the city's Chinese name , using its pronunciation in the Mandarin dialect. The name derives from the city's former status as the seat of the imperial Chinese Quan ("Spring") Prefecture. Ch'üan-chou was the Wade-Giles romanization of the same name; other forms include Chwanchow-foo, Chwan-chau fu, Chwanchew, Ts'üan-chou, Tswanchow-foo, Tswanchau, T'swan-chau fu, Ts'wan-chiu, Ts'wan-chow-fu, Thsiouan-tchéou-fou, and Thsíouan-chéou-fou. The romanizations Chuan-chiu, Choan-Chiu, and Shanju reflect the local Hokkien pronunciation.

The Postal Map name of the city was "Chinchew", a variant of Chincheo, the Portuguese and Spanish transcription of the local Hokkien name for Zhangzhou, the major Fujianese port trading with Macao and Manila in the 16th and 17th centuries.  It is uncertain when or why British sailors first applied the name to Quanzhou.

Its Arabic name Zaiton or "Zayton", once popular in English, means "[City] of Olives" and is a calque of Quanzhou's former Chinese nickname Citong Cheng meaning "tung-tree city", which is derived from the avenues of oil-bearing tung trees ordered to be planted around the city by the city's 10th-century ruler Liu Congxiao.  Variant transcriptions from the Arabic name include Caiton, Çaiton, Çayton, Zaytún, Zaitûn, Zaitún, and Zaitūn. The etymology of satin derives from "Zaitun".

Geography

Quanzhou proper lies on a split of land between the estuaries of the Jin and Luo rivers as they flow into Quanzhou Bay on the Taiwan Strait. Its surrounding prefecture extends west halfway across the province and is hilly and mountainous. Along with Xiamen and Zhangzhou to its south and Putian to its north, it makes up Fujian Province's Southern Coast region. In its mountainous interior, it borders Longyan to the southwest and Sanming to the northwest.

Climate
The city features a humid subtropical climate. Quanzhou has four distinct seasons. Its moderate temperature ranges from 0 to 38 degrees Celsius. In summer, there are typhoons that bring rain and some damage to the city.

Earthquakes 
Major earthquakes have been experienced in 1394 and on 29 December 1604.

History

Early history
Wang Guoqing used the area as a base of operations for the Chen State before he was subdued by the Sui general Yang Su in the AD590s. Quanzhou proper was established under the Tang in 718 on a spit of land between two branches of the Jin River. Muslim traders reached the city early on in its existence, along with their existing trade at Guangzhou and Yangzhou.

Song dynasty
Already connected to inland Fujian by roads and canals, Quanzhou grew to international importance in the first century of the Song. It received an office of the maritime trade bureau in 1079 or 1087 and functioned as the starting point of the Maritime Silk Road into the Yuan, eclipsing both the overland trade routes and Guangzhou. A 1095 inscription records two convoys, each of twenty ships, arriving from the Southern Seas each year. Quanzhou's maritime trade developed the area's ceramics, sugar, alcohol, and salt industries. Ninety per cent of Fujian's ceramic production at the time was jade-colored celadon, produced for export. Frankincense was such a coveted import that promotions for the trade superintendents at Guangzhou and Quanzhou were tied to the amount they were able to bring in during their terms in office. During this period it was one of the world's largest and most cosmopolitan seaports. By 1120, its prefecture claimed a population of around 500,000. Its Luoyang Bridge was formerly the most celebrated bridge in China and the 12th century Anping Bridge is also well known.Quanzhou initially continued to thrive under the Southern Song. A 1206 report listed merchants from Arabia, Iran, the Indian subcontinent, Sumatra, Cambodia, Brunei, Java, Champa, Burma, Anatolia, Korea, Japan and the city-states of the Philippines. One of its customs inspectors, Zhao Rugua, completed his compendious Description of Barbarian Nations , recording the people, places, and items involved in China's foreign trade in his age. Other imperial records from the time use it as the zero mile for distances between China and foreign countries. Tamil merchants carved idols of Vishnu and Shiva and constructed Hindu temples in Quanzhou. Over the course of the 13th century, however, Quanzhou's prosperity declined due to instability among its trading partners and increasing restrictions introduced by the Song in an attempt to restrict the outflow of copper and bronze currency from areas forced to use hyperinflating paper money. The increasing importance of Japan to China's foreign trade also benefited Ningbonese merchants at Quanzhou's expense, given their extensive contacts with Japan's major ports on Hakata Bay on Kyushu.

Yuan dynasty
Under the Mongolian Yuan dynasty, a superintendent of foreign trade was established in the city in 1277, along with those at Shanghai, Ningbo, and Guangzhou. The former Song superintendent Pu Shougeng, an Arab or Persian Muslim, was retained for the new post, using his contacts to restore the city's trade under its new rulers. He was broadly successful, restoring much of the port's former greatness, and his office became hereditary in his descendants. Into the 1280s, Quanzhou sometimes served as the provincial capital for Fujian. Its population was around 455,000 in 1283, the major items of trade being pepper and other spices, gemstones, pearls, and porcelain. Marco Polo recorded that the Yuan emperors derived "a vast revenue" from their 10% duty on the port's commerce; he called Quanzhou's port "one of the two greatest havens in the world for commerce" and "the Alexandria of the East". Ibn Battuta simply called it the greatest port in the world. Polo noted its tattoo artists were famed throughout Southeast Asia. It was the point of departure for Marco Polo's 1292 return expedition, escorting the 17-year-old Mongolian princess Kököchin to her fiancé in the Persian Ilkhanate; a few decades later, it was the point of arrival and departure for Ibn Battuta. Kublai Khan's invasions of Japan and Java sailed primarily from its port. In the mid-1320s, Friar Odoric noted the town's two Franciscan friaries, but admitted the Buddhist monasteries were much larger, with over 3000 monks in one.

In 1357–1367, the Yisibaxi Muslim Persian garrison started the Ispah rebellion against the Yuan dynasty in Quanzhou and southern Fujian due to increasingly anti-Muslim laws. Persian merchants Sayf ad-Din (賽甫丁) and Amir ad-Din (阿迷里丁) led the revolt. Persian official Yawuna assassinated both Saif ud-Din and Amir ad-Din in 1362 and took control of the Muslim rebel forces. The Muslim rebels tried to strike north and took over some parts of Xinghua but were defeated at Fuzhou. Yuan provincial loyalist forces from Fuzhou defeated the Muslim rebels in 1367. Sayf ad-Din and Amir ad-Din fought for Fuzhou and Xinghua for five years. They both were murdered by another Muslim called Nawuna in 1362 so he then took control of Quanzhou and the Ispah garrison for five more years until his defeat by the Yuan authorities.

Nawuna was a descendant of Pu Shougeng, who was killed in turn by Chen Youding. Chen began a campaign of persecution against the city's Sunni community—including massacres and grave desecration—that eventually became a three-days anti-foreign massacre. Emigrants fleeing the persecution rose to prominent positions throughout Southeast Asia, spurring the development of Islam on Java and elsewhere. The Yuan were expelled in 1368, and they turned against Pu Shougeng's family and the Muslims and slaughtered Pu Shougeng's descendants in the Ispah rebellion. Mosques and other buildings with foreign architecture were almost all destroyed and the Yuan imperial soldiers killed most of the descendants of Pu Shougeng and mutilated their corpses.

Ming dynasty 
The Ming discouraged foreign commerce other than formal tributary missions. By 1473, trade had declined to the point that Quanzhou was no longer the headquarters of the imperial customs service for Fujian. The Japanese or dwarf pirates, who came from many different ethnicities, including Japanese, Korean, and Chinese, forced Quanzhou's Superintendency of Trade to close completely in 1522.  During the Qing Dynasty, the Sea Ban did not help the city's traders or fishermen: they were forced to abandon their access to the sea for years at a time and coastal farmers forced to relocate miles inland to inner counties like Yongchun and Anxi. Violent large scale clan fights with the thousands of non-native families from Guangdong who were deported to Quanzhou city by the Qing immediately occurred.

19th century to present day 

In the 19th century, the city walls still protected a circuit of  but embraced much vacant ground. The bay began to attract Jardines' and Dents' opium ships from 1832. Following the First Opium War, Governor Henry Pottinger proposed using Quanzhou as an official opium depot to keep the trade out of Hong Kong and the other treaty ports but the rents sought by the imperial commissioner Qiying were too high. When Chinese pirates overran the receiving ships in Shenhu Bay to capture their stockpiles of silver bullion in 1847, however, the traders moved to Quanzhou Bay regardless.  Around 1862, a Protestant mission was set up in Quanzhou. As late as the middle of the century, large Chinese junks could still access the town easily, trading in tea, sugar, tobacco, porcelain, and nankeens, but sand bars created by the rivers around the town had generally incapacitated its harbor by the First World War. It remained a large and prosperous city, but conducted its maritime trade through Anhai.

After the Chinese Civil War, Kinmen became disconnected from Quanzhou with the Nationalists successfully defended Kinmen from the Communist takeover attempt.

Administrative divisions
The prefecture-level city of Quanzhou administers four districts, three county-level cities, four counties, and two special economic districts. The People's Republic of China claims Kinmen Islands (Quemoy) (administered and also claimed by the Republic of China) as Kinmen County under the administration of Quanzhou.

*Since its founding in 1949, the People's Republic of China ("Mainland China") has claimed the Kinmen Islands (Quemoy) as part of Quanzhou but has never controlled them; they are administered by and also claimed by the Republic of China (Taiwan).

Demographics
As of the 2010 census, Quanzhou has a population of 8,128,530. Its built-up area is home to 6,107,475 inhabitants, encompassing the Licheng, Fengze, and Luojiang urban districts; Jinjiang, Nan'an, and Shishi cities; Hui'an County; and the Quanzhou District for Taiwanese Investment.

Religion

Medieval Quanzhou was long one of the most cosmopolitan Chinese cities, with Chinese folk religious temples, Buddhist temples, Taoist temples and Hindu temples; Islamic mosques; and Christian churches, including Nestorian and a cathedral (financed by a rich Armenian lady) and two Franciscan friaries. Andrew of Perugia served as the Roman Catholic bishop of the city from 1322. Odoric of Pordenone was responsible for relocating the relics of the four Franciscans martyred at Thane in India in 1321 to the mission in Quanzhou. English Presbyterian missionaries raised a chapel around 1862. The Qingjing Mosque dates to 1009 but is now preserved as a museum. The Buddhist Kaiyuan Temple has been repeatedly rebuilt but includes two 5-story 13th-century pagodas. Among the most popular folk or Taoist temples is Guan Yue Temple  that is dedicated to Lord Yue and famous Lord Guan, the God of Martial who is honored for his righteousness and the spirit of brotherhood. Jinjiang also preserves the Cao'an Temple, originally constructed by Manicheans under the Yuan but now used by New Age spiritualists, and a Confucian Temple (Wenmiao).

Language

Locals speak the Quanzhou variety of Min Nan essentially the same as the Amoy dialect spoken in Xiamen, and similar to South East Asian Hokkien and Taiwanese.  It is unintelligible with Mandarin. Many overseas Chinese whose ancestors came from the Quanzhou area, especially those in Southeast Asia, often speak mainly Hokkien at home. Around the "Southern Min triangle area," which includes Quanzhou, Xiamen and Zhangzhou, locals all speak Minnan languages. The dialects they speak are similar but have different intonations.

Emigration

Quanzhou has been a source for Chinese emigration to Southeast Asia and Taiwan. Some of these communities date to Quanzhou's heyday a millennium ago under the Song and Yuan dynasties. About 6 million overseas Chinese trace their ancestry to Quanzhou and Tong'an county. Most of them live in Southeast Asia, including Singapore, the Philippines, Malaysia, Indonesia, Burma, and Thailand.

Economy

Historically, Quanzhou exported black tea, camphor, sugar, indigo, tobacco, ceramics, cloth made of grass, and some minerals. They imported, primarily from Guangzhou, wool cloth, wine, and watches, as of 1832. As of that time, the East India Company was exporting an estimated £150,000 a year in black tea from Quanzhou.

Quanzhou is a major exporter of agricultural products such as tea, banana, lychee and rice. It is also a major producer of quarry granite and ceramics. Other industries include textiles, footwear, fashion and apparel, packaging, machinery, paper and petrochemicals.

Quanzhou is the biggest automotive market in Fujian; it has the highest rate of private automobile possession.

Its GDP ranked first in Fujian Province for 20 years, from 1991 to 2010. In 2008, Quanzhou's textile and apparel production accounted for 10% of China's overall apparel production, stone exports account for 50% of Chinese stone exports, resin handicraft exports account for 70% of the country's total, ceramic exports account for 67% of the country's total, candy production accounts for 20%, and the production of sport and tourism shoes accounts for 80% of Chinese, and 20% of world production.
Because of this, Quanzhou is known today as China's "shoe city." Quanzhou's 3,000 shoe factories produce 500 million pairs a year, making nearly one in every four pairs of sneakers made in China.

Transport

Quanzhou is an important transport hub within southeastern Fujian province. Many export industries in the Fujian interior cities will transport goods to Quanzhou ports. Quanzhou Port was one of the most prosperous port in Tang Dynasty while now still an important one for exporting. Quanzhou is also connected by major roads from Fuzhou to the north and Xiamen to the south.

There is a passenger ferry terminal in Shijing, Nan'an, Fujian, with regular service to the Shuitou Port in the ROC-controlled Kinmen Island.

Air
Quanzhou Jinjiang International Airport is Quanzhou region's airport, served by passenger flights within Fujian province and other destinations throughout the country.

Railway
Quanzhou has two kinds of railway service. The Zhangping–Quanzhou–Xiaocuo railway, a "conventional" rail line opened ca. 2001, connects several cargo stations within Quanzhou Prefecture with the interior of Fujian and the rest of the country. Until 2014, this line also had passenger service, with fairly slow passenger trains from Beijing, Wuhan, and other places throughout the country terminating at the Quanzhou East Railway Station, a few kilometers northeast of the center of the city. Passenger service on this line was terminated, and Quanzhou East railway station closed 9 December 2014.

Since 2010, Quanzhou is served by the high-speed Fuzhou–Xiamen railway, part of the Hangzhou–Fuzhou–Shenzhen high-speed railway, which runs along China's southeastern sea coast. High-speed trains on this line stop at Quanzhou railway station (in Beifeng Subdistrict of Fengze District, some 10 miles north of Quanzhou city center) and Jinjiang railway station. Trains to Xiamen take under 45 minutes, making it a convenient weekend or day trip. By 2015, direct high-speed service has become available to a number of cities in the country's interior, from Beijing to Chongqing and Guiyang.

Bus
Long-distance bus services also run daily/nightly to Shenzhen and other major cities. Quanzhou bus station operated from 1990 to 2020.

Colleges and universities
Huaqiao University (national)
Yang-en University (private)
Quanzhou Normal University (public)
Quanzhou Medical College (public)
 Huaguang Photography and Art College (private)
Liming Vocational University (public)

Culture
Quanzhou is listed as one of the 24 famous historic cultural cities first approved by the Chinese government. Notable cultural practices include:

Liyuan Opera
Puppet Show
Gaojia Opera
Dacheng Opera
Nanyin, a musical style dating to the Han but performed in the local dialect
Quanzhou Shaolin Five Ancestors Fist
Yongchun martial arts

The city hosted the Sixth National Peasants' Games in 2008. Signature local dishes include rice dumplings and oyster omelettes.

Notable Historical and cultural sites (the 18 views of Quanzhou as recommended by the Fujian tourism board) include the Ashab Mosque and Kaiyuan Temple mentioned above, as well as:

Qing Yuan mountain - The tallest hill within the city limits, which hosts a great view of West lake.
East Lake Park - Located in the city center. It is home to a small zoo.
West Lake Park - The largest body of fresh water within the city limits.
Scholar Street  - Champion street about 500 meters long, elegant environment, mainly engaged in tourism and cultural crafts.

Notable Modern cultural sites include:

Fengze Square - Located in the city center and acts as a venue for shows and events.
Dapingshan - The second tallest hill within the city limits, crowned with an enormous equestrian statue of Zheng Chenggong.
The Embassy Lounge - Situated in the "1916 Cultural Ideas Zone" which acts as a platform for mixing traditional Chinese art with modern building techniques and designs

Relics from Quanzhou's past are preserved at the Maritime or Overseas-Relations History Museum. It includes large exhibits on Song-era ships and Yuan-era tombstones. A particularly important exhibit is the so-called Quanzhou ship, a seagoing junk that sunk some time after 1272 and was recovered in 1973–74.

The old city center preserves "balcony buildings", a style of southern Chinese architecture from the Republican Era.

Notable residents
Li Nu, son of Li Lu, visited Hormuz in Persia in 1376, converted to Islam, married a Persian girl, and brought her back to Quanzhou. Li Nu was the ancestor of the Ming reformer Li Chih.

The Ding or Ting family of Chendai in Quanzhou claims descent from the Muslim leader Sayyid Ajjal Shams al-Din Omar through his son Nasr al-Din or Nasruddin (Chinese: Nasulading). The Dings have branches in Taiwan, the Philippines, and Malaysia among the Chinese communities there, no longer practicing Islam but still maintaining a Hui identity. The deputy secretary-general of the Chinese Muslim Association on Taiwan, Ishag Ma has claimed "Sayyid is an honorable title given to descendants of the Prophet Mohammed, hence Sayyid Shamsuddin must be connected to Prophet Mohammed". The Ding family in Taisi Township in Yunlin County of Taiwan, traces descent from him through the Ding of Quanzhou in Fujian. Nasruddin was appointed governor in Karadjang and retained his position in Yunnan till his death, which Rashid, writing about 1300, says occurred five or six years before. (According to the History of Yuan, "Nasulading" died in 1292.) Nasruddin's son Abubeker, who had the surname Bayan Fenchan (evidently the Boyen ch'a-r of the Yüan shi), was governor in Zaitun at the time Rashid wrote. He bore also his grandfather's title of Sayid Edjell and was Minister of Finance under Kublai's successor. Nasruddin is mentioned by Marco Polo, who styles him "Nescradin".

Nuclear physicist Zhang Wenyu born in Hui'an was one of the founders of cosmic ray research and high energy experimental physics in China. He was also a member of the Chinese Academy of Sciences. Explosion mechanics scientist and researcher Lin Junde at Xinjiang Malan Nuclear Test Base was born in Yongchun in Quanzhou. Physicist Xie Xide born in Shishi and served as president of Fudan University from 1983 to 1989, making her the very first female sitting president of any university in modern China. Quantum physicist Guo Guangcan born in Hui'an is a professor at the University of Science and Technology of China and Peking University.

Actress and philanthropist Yao Chen was born in Shishi in Quanzhou.

Villages 
 

Xunpu

Gallery

Notes

Explanatory notes

Citations

General and cited references
 
 
 
 
 
 
 , annotated by Henri Cordier in 1920, London: John Murray.

Further reading

External links

 The Stones of Zayton speak from China Heritage Newsletter